The Cowichan Valley is a region around the Cowichan River, Cowichan Bay and Cowichan Lake on Vancouver Island, in British Columbia, Canada. There is some debate as to the origin of the name Cowichan, which many   believe to be an anglicized form of the First Nations tribal name Quw'utsun.

Communities
Communities that lie within the actual Cowichan River/Cowichan Bay watershed include Duncan, Lake Cowichan, Cowichan Bay, Cowichan Station and Maple Bay.  Other nearby communities are affiliated mainly through the Cowichan Valley Regional District.  Crofton and Chemainus, lie within the Chemainus River Valley, while Cobble Hill, Shawnigan Lake, Mill Bay, and Ladysmith inhabit a coastal plain that includes the Cowichan and Chemainus River deltas.

The Trans Canada Trail goes through the Valley, and there are numerous options for hiking enthusiasts.  On January 7, 2010 an air quality monitoring station was installed.

Agriculture
The Cowichan Valley is the home of a growing number of vineyards and wineries.  They include Unsworth Vineyards, Cherry Point Vineyards, Blue Grouse, Glenterra, Vigneti Zanatta, Venturi-Schulze, and Averill Creek. The warm, dry summers and mild, moist winters make this area part of Canada's only maritime Mediterranean climate, providing good growing conditions for many grape varietals.

References

 
Southern Vancouver Island
Wine regions of British Columbia